Vachina Kodalu Nachindi is a 1959 Indian Telugu-language drama film, produced by Ponnaluri Vasanth Kumar Reddy under the Sudhakar Films banner and directed by D. Yoganand. It stars N. T. Rama Rao and Jamuna. The music is composed by Susarla Dakshinamurthi.

Plot
Chandra (Jamuna) is a club dancer who earns her livelihood by entertaining the public, but her earning is not sufficient for her father Jogulu's (C.S.R) drinking and they stay along with a goon Raju (Rajanala). Once there is a police ride in the club even though one constable Ravi (N. T. Rama Rao) notices Chandra leaves her by giving caution not to lead such a life. Chandra realizes her mistake and develops respect towards the police. From that day she does not listen to Jogulu's wish of earning when Chandra learns that Jogulu is not her father. Raju plans to molest her. But Gopi a young lad gives support to Chandra and saves her from Jogulu and Raju. Gopi and Chandra decide to earn by performing dances in the street. Chandra meets Ravi in one of the performances, gets attracted and they love each other. Raju and Jogulu are annoyed about this and inform CID Venkat Swamy (Relangi). Venkat Swamy cautions Ravi's mother Jayamma (Kannamba) about this and advises her to perform  Ravi's marriage. Meanwhile, Ravi suspects Chandra by the plan played by Jogulu and Raju and they get separated. But to rescue Ravi from Raju, Chandra goes to his village.  When Ravi reaches home, his mother inquires and he says that he will marry only Chandra. Then she says to bring her and she takes approval from the mother goddess. Knowing this, Chandra feels very happy, but she disappears and Ravi becomes mad. Jayamma prays to Venkat Swamy to get her back. Meanwhile, Jogulu was killed, Gopi is not traceable, Police arrest Chandra, and she agrees that she had killed Jogulu. The rest of the story is about why Chandra disappeared, what happens to Gopi, how did Venkat Swamy be successful and whether Chandra's life turns into a comedy or tragedy.

Cast
N. T. Rama Rao as Ravi
Jamuna as Chandra
Rajanala as Raju
Relangi as Venkata Sawmy
C.S.R. as Jogulu
Kannamba as Jayamma
Suryakantham as Ratnam

Soundtrack

Music composed by Susarla Dakshinamurthi. Music released on Audio Company.

References

Indian drama films
Films scored by Susarla Dakshinamurthi
1959 drama films
1959 films